Gary Athans (born 12 June 1961 in Kelowna, British Columbia) is a Canadian former alpine skier who competed in the 1984 Winter Olympics.

Gary Athans comes from a tradition of athletic success: his father George Athans (George Sr.) was an Olympic diver who won medals nationally and at the British Empire Games; his mother was a championship swimmer; his older brother George Athans Jr. is a two-time world water-skiing champion; and another brother, Greg, was a successful freestyle skier. Gary chose alpine skiing and won the Junior World Championships in 1975. He spent eight years on the Canadian national team and later represented his nation at the 1984 Winter Olympics and finished 26th in a field of 61 competitors. He now works in real estate, having retired from active competition in the late 1980s. He also had a career as a water skiing and ski racing instructor in Kelowna, British Columbia, where a local swimming pool is named in his family’s honor, and he worked in films as a professional stunt skier. In addition to skiing, he was also a junior British Columbia provincial diving champion during the 1970s. With his family he was made a member of the Central Okanagan Sports Hall of Fame in 2009 and in 2010 he helped carry the Olympic torch as it made its way to Vancouver for the 2010 Winter Games.

He has 4 children. Marcus Athans (2000) and Isaac Athans (2002) who are both following in the family's footsteps. Marcus is a member of the BC Alpine Ski team. Isaac is a Canadian record holder in boys water ski jump and plays football for the Calgary Dinos University of Calgary Team.

External links

References

1961 births
Living people
Canadian male alpine skiers
Olympic alpine skiers of Canada
Alpine skiers at the 1984 Winter Olympics
Sportspeople from Kelowna